Mississippian may  refer to:
Mississippian (geology), a subperiod of the Carboniferous period in the geologic timescale, roughly 360 to 325 million years ago
Mississippian culture, a culture of Native American mound-builders from 900 to 1500 AD
Mississippian Railway, a short line railroad
A native of Mississippi

See also
Mississippi (disambiguation)